Rana Babar Hussain Abid is a Pakistani politician who had been a member of the Provincial Assembly of the Punjab from August 2018 till January 2023. Previously, he was a Member of the Provincial Assembly of the Punjab from April 2008 to December 2012 and again from August 2013 to May 2018.

Early life and education
He was born on 18 August 1973 in Mian Channu.

He received a degree of Bachelor of Commerce from Hailey College of Commerce and a degree of Master of Business Administration which he received in 1996 from Philippine School of Business Administration.

Political career
He was elected to the Provincial Assembly of the Punjab as a candidate of Pakistan Peoples Party (PPP) from Constituency PP-217 (Khanewal-VI) in 2008 Pakistani general election. He received 39,938 votes and defeated Zahoor Hussain Qureshi.

In December 2012, he quit PPP and joined Pakistan Muslim League (N) (PML-N). He also resigned from his Punjab Assembly seat.

In 2013, he was allocated PML-N ticket to contest the 2013 general election from Constituency NA-217 (Khanewal-VI). However the election in the constituency was postponed after the death of a candidate.

He was re-elected to the Provincial Assembly of the Punjab as a candidate of PML-N rom Constituency PP-217 (Khanewal-VI) in by-polls held in August 2013.

He was re-elected to the Provincial Assembly of the Punjab as a candidate of PML-N from Constituency PP-208 (Khanewal-VI) in 2018 Pakistani general election.

References

Living people
Punjab MPAs 2013–2018
1973 births
Pakistan Muslim League (N) MPAs (Punjab)
Punjab MPAs 2008–2013
Punjab MPAs 2018–2023
Pakistan People's Party MPAs (Punjab)